Upper Church, Stratton Major Parish is a historic Episcopal church located near Shanghai, King and Queen County, Virginia. It was built between about 1724 and 1729, and is a one-story, rectangular, brick structure, measuring 33 feet, 9 inches, long by 64 feet.  The church is topped by a steeply pitched gable roof with a box cornice and cornice returns. The church was restored after a fire gutted the interior in the 1840s.  The church has been used by Baptists and later Methodists since the early-19th century.

It was listed on the National Register of Historic Places in 1973.

References

Churches on the National Register of Historic Places in Virginia
Baptist churches in Virginia
Episcopal churches in Virginia
Methodist churches in Virginia
Churches completed in 1729
Churches in King and Queen County, Virginia
National Register of Historic Places in King and Queen County, Virginia
18th-century Episcopal church buildings
1729 establishments in the Thirteen Colonies